Putative P2Y purinoceptor 10 is a protein that, in humans, is encoded by the P2RY10 gene.

Function 

The protein encoded by this gene belongs to the family of G-protein coupled receptors that is preferentially activated by adenosine and uridine nucleotides. Two alternatively spliced transcript variants encoding the same protein isoform have been found for this gene.

See also 
 P2Y receptor

References

Further reading 

 

G protein-coupled receptors